

Works

See also

 List of public art in Halifax, Nova Scotia
 List of public art in Montreal

Culture of Victoria, British Columbia
Victoria